Dudley Ryder, 1st Earl of Harrowby, PC, FSA (22 December 176226 December 1847) was a prominent British politician of the Pittite faction and the Tory party.

Background and education
Born in London, Ryder was the eldest son of Nathaniel Ryder, 1st Baron Harrowby, and his wife Elizabeth (née Terrick). Sir Dudley Ryder was his grandfather and Richard Ryder his younger brother. He was educated at Harrow School and St John's College, Cambridge.

Political career
Harrowby was elected to his father's old Parliament seat of Tiverton in 1784. His administrative career began with an appointment to be Joint Parliamentary Under-Secretary of State for Foreign Affairs in 1789. In 1791 he was appointed joint Paymaster of the Forces, having been made Vice-President of the Board of Trade in 1790. He resigned the positions and also that of Treasurer of the Navy when he succeeded to his father's barony in June 1803. In 1804 he was Secretary of State for Foreign Affairs. After James Monroe's first interview with him on 30 May 1804, "...Monroe reported to his Government that Lord Harrowby's manners were designedly unfriendly; his reception was rough, his comments on the Senate's habit of mutilating treaties were harsh, his conduct throughout the interview was calculated to wound and to irritate."

In 1805 he was Chancellor of the Duchy of Lancaster under his intimate friend William Pitt; in the latter year he was sent on a special and important mission to the emperors of Austria and Russia and the king of Prussia as part of the Hanover Expedition. In 1809 he was honoured when he was made Viscount Sandon, of Sandon in the County of Stafford, and Earl of Harrowby, in the County of Lincoln. From November 1809 to June 1812 he served as Minister without portfolio in the cabinet of Spencer Perceval.

From 1812 to 1827, he served as Lord President of the Council under Lord Liverpool. After George Canning's death in 1827, Harrowby refused to serve George IV as prime minister and never held office again. Despite this he continued to take part in politics, being especially prominent during the deadlock which preceded the passing of the Reform Bill in 1832. Harrowby's long association with the Tories did not prevent him from assisting to remove the disabilities of Roman Catholics and Protestant dissenters, or from supporting the movement for electoral reform; he was also in favour of the emancipation of the slaves. He was a member of the Literary Association of the Friends of Poland.

Family
Lord Harrowby married Lady Susanna Leveson-Gower, daughter of Granville Leveson-Gower, 1st Marquess of Stafford, in 1795. They had three sons and five daughters. She died in May 1838. Lord Harrowby survived her by nine years and died in December 1847 at his Staffordshire residence, Sandon Hall, aged 85, being, as Charles Cavendish Fulke Greville says, "the last of his generation and of the colleagues of Mr Pitt, the sole survivor of those stirring times and mighty contests." He was succeeded in his titles by his eldest son Dudley. His second son, Granville Ryder, became a Member of Parliament.

Notes

References
Kidd, Charles, Williamson, David (editors). Debrett's Peerage and Baronetage (1990 edition). New York: St Martin's Press, 1990,

External links

1762 births
1847 deaths
Alumni of St John's College, Cambridge
British MPs 1784–1790
British MPs 1790–1796
British MPs 1796–1800
British Secretaries of State
British Secretaries of State for Foreign Affairs
Chancellors of the Duchy of Lancaster
Earls of Harrowby
Lord Presidents of the Council
Ryder, Dudley
Members of the Privy Council of Great Britain
Ryder, Dudley
People educated at Harrow School
Paymasters of the Forces
Ryder, Dudley
Ryder, Dudley
Ryder, Dudley
Harrowby, E1
UK MPs who were granted peerages
Dudley
Presidents of the Board of Control